For other persons with a similar name see William Campbell (disambiguation)

William Campbell (ca. 1767 – October 27, 1844 Cherry Valley, Otsego County, New York) was an American physician, merchant, surveyor and politician from New York.

Life
He was the oldest son of American Revolutionary War Colonel Samuel Campbell (1738–1824) and Jane Cannon Campbell (1743–1836).

He ran a drug and hardware store in Cherry Valley.

He was a member of the New York State Assembly (Otsego Co.) in 1816 and 1817 as a Federalist, and in 1827.

He was New York State Surveyor General from 1835 to 1838.

U.S. Representative William W. Campbell was his nephew.

References

Sources
Obit of his nephew John C. Campbell in NYT on March 27, 1890
Campbell genealogy at GeoCities
Campbell genealogy at RootsWeb
 Political Graveyard
The New York Civil List compiled by Franklin Benjamin Hough (pages 37f and 263; Weed, Parsons and Co., 1858)
 Dr. Campbell mentioned in Note 2
 History of Cherry Valley (page 59)
The American Biographical Dictionary by William Allen (page 189; John P. Jewett & Co, Boston, 1857)
The American Almanac for 1845 (page 314)

1760s births
1844 deaths
New York State Engineers and Surveyors
Members of the New York State Assembly
New York (state) Federalists
People from Cherry Valley, New York